Jeļena Ostapenko defeated Simona Halep in the final, 4–6, 6–4, 6–3 to win the women's singles tennis title at the 2017 French Open. It was her maiden major title, and her maiden WTA Tour-level singles title overall. She became the first Latvian woman to reach the major semifinal, the first Latvian (male or female) to reach the major final, the first Latvian to win a major singles title, the youngest woman to win the French Open since Iva Majoli in 1997, and the first woman since Barbara Jordan at the 1979 Australian Open to win a major as her first tour-level singles title. Ostapenko was the first unseeded player to win a major since Kim Clijsters in the 2009 US Open. She was also the first unseeded player to win the title since Margaret Scriven in 1933, and the lowest-ranked to do so (world No. 47) since the computerized rankings began in 1975.

Garbiñe Muguruza was the defending champion, but was defeated in the fourth round by Kristina Mladenovic.

With the losses of Muguruza, Venus Williams, Samantha Stosur and Svetlana Kuznetsova in the fourth round, a maiden Grand Slam champion was guaranteed at the tournament. This marked the first French Open since 1977, and the first major since the 1979 Australian Open, not to feature a former major champion in the quarterfinals.

Angelique Kerber retained the WTA No. 1 singles ranking after Halep lost in the final, even though she lost in the first round. Kerber's loss marked the first time in the Open Era that the top seed lost in the first round, and the first time this happened at any major since the 2001 Wimbledon Championships.

This was the first French Open since 2011 to feature neither Maria Sharapova nor Serena Williams in the final. Williams was absent due to pregnancy, and Sharapova did not qualify based on her ranking.

Seeds
 
  Angelique Kerber (first round)
  Karolína Plíšková (semifinals)
  Simona Halep     (final)
  Garbiñe Muguruza (fourth round)
  Elina Svitolina (quarterfinals)
  Dominika Cibulková (second round)
  Johanna Konta (first round)
  Svetlana Kuznetsova (fourth round)
   Agnieszka Radwańska (third round)
  Venus Williams (fourth round)
  Caroline Wozniacki (quarterfinals)
  Madison Keys (second round)
  Kristina Mladenovic (quarterfinals)
  Elena Vesnina (third round)
  Petra Kvitová (second round)
  Anastasia Pavlyuchenkova (second round)

  Anastasija Sevastova (third round)
  Kiki Bertens (second round)
  CoCo Vandeweghe (first round)
  Barbora Strýcová (second round)
  Carla Suárez Navarro (fourth round)
  Mirjana Lučić-Baroni (first round)
  Samantha Stosur (fourth round)
  Daria Gavrilova (first round)
  Lauren Davis (first round)
  Daria Kasatkina (third round)
  Yulia Putintseva (third round)
  Caroline Garcia (quarterfinals)
  Ana Konjuh (second round)
  Timea Bacsinszky (semifinals)
  Roberta Vinci (first round)
  Zhang Shuai (third round)

Draw

Finals

Top half

Section 1

Section 2

Section 3

Section 4

Bottom half

Section 5

Section 6

Section 7

Section 8

Seeded players
The following are the seeded players. Seedings are based on 22 May 2017. Rank and points before are as of 29 May 2017.

Because the tournament takes place one week later than in 2016, points defending includes results from both the 2016 French Open and tournaments from the week of 6 June 2016 (Nottingham and 's-Hertogenbosch).

Withdrawn players
The following players would have been seeded, but they withdrew from the event.

Other entry information

Wild cards

Protected ranking
  Magdaléna Rybáriková (108)
  Ajla Tomljanović (75)

Qualifiers

Lucky loser
  Ons Jabeur

Withdrawals

Retirements
  Patricia Maria Țig

Championship match statistics

Notes

References

External links

2017 French Open – Women's draws and results at the International Tennis Federation

Women's Singles
French Open by year – Women's singles
French Open - Women's Singles